King of the Jews or King of the Judeans may refer to:

History
Ruler of historic kingdoms and client states:
 Kings of Israel and Judah
 Kings of Judah (c.931 – 586 BCE)
Others:
 Mocking epithet applied to Peter of Castile (1334–1369) by Henry of Trastamara
 In the antisemitic forgery The Protocols of the Elders of Zion, the future figurehead envisaged by the Elders.

Religion
 A title of the Jewish Messiah
 Jesus, King of the Jews
 See also Davidic line and Jewish Messiah claimants

Literature
King of the Jews, play by Grand Duke Konstantin Konstantinovich of Russia
King of the Jews, book by Waverley Root
King of the Jews, 1979 novel by Leslie Epstein
King of the Jews (Nick Tosches book), 2005 book by Nick Tosches

Music
 "The King of the Jews", incidental music by  Alexander Glazunov for the play by the Grand Duke Konstantin Konstantinovich of Russia
 "King of the Jews", a track on the 1973 Christian Rock album What a Day by Phil Keaggy
 "Tiny, King of the Jews", a track on the 1987 noise rock album Songs About Fucking by Big Black.
 King of the Jews (album), a 1991 album by the band Oxbow
 "King of the Jews", a track on the 1992 doom metal album Fall Babylon Fall by Veni Domine.

See also
 King of Judea (disambiguation)

Biblical phrases